The Midwest Reggae Fest is a three-day reggae event held at Clay's Park Resort in North Lawrence, Ohio. It is an annual event and today the event has completed  years. The festival features three days of live reggae bands along with numerous food vendors, vendors of Caribbean fashions and accessories, camping, free canoeing, swimming, water rides, and various other outdoor activities and entertainment.

There was no festival in 2020.

See also
List of reggae festivals

References

External links 
 Main page for the Mid West Reggae Fest
 Main site for One Love Productions & Packy Malley, the promoter of the Mid West Reggae Fest
 Informative page about Clay's Park Resort

Music festivals in Ohio
Tourist attractions in Stark County, Ohio
Reggae festivals in the United States